Alamabad or Elmabad may refer to:

Alamabad, Fars
Alamabad, Kerman
Alamabad-e Mohandes, Khuzestan
Alamabad, Lorestan (disambiguation)
Alamabad, Dorud
Alamabad, Selseleh
Alamabad-e Sofla
Alamabad, Khash, Sistan and Baluchestan Province
Alamabad, Mirjaveh, Sistan and Baluchestan Province
Elmabad, West Azerbaijan